There are over 9000 Grade I listed buildings in England. This page is a list of these buildings in the county of Cumbria, sub-divided by district.

Allerdale

|}

Barrow-in-Furness

|}

Carlisle

|}

Copeland

|}

Eden

|}

South Lakeland

|}

See also

 Listed buildings in Barrow-in-Furness
 Grade II* listed buildings in Cumbria

Notes

External links

 
 
 Grade I listed